Alejandro Enrique González Pareja (born 11 October 1977) is a Chilean former football player who played as a midfielder for clubs in Chile, the United States and Costa Rica.

Club career
A playmaker from Universidad Católica youth system, González took part of tours through Netherlands, France, Spain and the United States. In 1998, he moved to the United States and joined Jacksonville Cyclones in the A-League.

He returned to Chile in 2000 and played for Unión La Calera, winning the Chilean Tercera División.

In his homeland, he also played for Deportes Puerto Montt (2001) and Palestino (2004) in the top division. 

From 2005 to 2007, he played for Puerto Rico Islanders in the USL First Division, moving to the left.back position. In addition, he made two appearances for Indiana Invaders in 2005.

In 2008, he played for Costa Rican side Alajuelense.

In the second level of the Chilean football, he played for Deportes Melipilla (2002–03), Unión La Calera (2009) and Deportes Puerto Montt (2010–11).

Honours
Unión La Calera
 Tercera División de Chile:

References

External links

Alejandro González at SoccerStats.us
alejandro González at Tribuna.com 
Alejandro González at MatchEnDirect.fr  

1977 births
Living people
Footballers from Santiago
Chilean footballers
Chilean expatriate footballers
Club Deportivo Universidad Católica footballers
Jacksonville Cyclones players
Unión La Calera footballers
Puerto Montt footballers
Deportes Melipilla footballers
Club Deportivo Palestino footballers
Indiana Invaders players
Puerto Rico Islanders players
L.D. Alajuelense footballers
Chilean Primera División players
A-League (1995–2004) players
Tercera División de Chile players
Primera B de Chile players
USL First Division players
Liga FPD players
Chilean expatriate sportspeople in the United States
Chilean expatriate sportspeople in Puerto Rico
Chilean expatriate sportspeople in Costa Rica
Expatriate soccer players in the United States
Expatriate footballers in Puerto Rico
Expatriate footballers in Costa Rica
Association football midfielders